The Big Ten Coach of the Year is an annual award given out at the conclusion of the Big Ten regular season to the best coach in the conference as voted by a media panel and the head coaches of each team.

The Player of the Year was first awarded in 2014 and is a successor to the CCHA Coach of the Year which was discontinued after the conference dissolved due to the 2013–14 NCAA conference realignment.

Award winners

Winners by school

References

College ice hockey coach of the year awards in the United States
^